Kızılay is a neighbourhood in Çankaya, Ankara, Turkey. It is named after the Kızılay Derneği (Turkish Red Crescent) whose headquarters used to be located at the Kızılay Square, its centre.

Güvenpark in Kızılay has many trees and benches, while a metro station and a bus terminal nearby provide easy access to other parts of the city.

On March 13, 2016, Kızılay suffered a terrorist bombing which killed 37 people and injured 125. The bombing took place on Atatürk Boulevard near Güvenpark.

Demographics

Gallery

References

External links

Populated places in Ankara Province
Neighbourhoods of Ankara
Çankaya, Ankara